is a Japanese politician of the Liberal Democratic Party, a member of the House of Representatives in the Diet (national legislature).

Overview 
A native of Kashima, Saga and a graduate of the University of Tokyo, he was elected to the House of Representatives for the first time in 1996 after working for the JR.

Career 
Japanese National Railways (employee of Kyusyu Railway Co. after the privatization) 
State Minister of Agriculture, Forestry, and Fisheries
Parliamentary Vice-Minister of Foreign Affairs
Parliamentary Vice-Minister of Land, Infrastructure, Transport and Tourism
Chairman, Committee on Land, Infrastructure, Transport and Tourism
Chairman, Special Committee on Audit and Oversight of Administration
Chairman, Regional Government Promotion Headquarters
Minister of reconstruction for disaster-hit regions

Yasukuni visits and right wing affiliations 

On August 11, 2016, one week after joining Prime Minister Shinzō Abe's cabinet as reconstruction minister for disaster-hit regions, Masahiro Imamura visited the controversial Yasukuni shrine.

In late 2016, hours after Abe and Defense Minister Tomomi Inada met President Barack Obama in Hawaii and Abe expressed 'everlasting condolences' for the casualties of the 1941 attack on Pearl Harbor in Hawaii, Imamura again visited the shrine. The visit garnered "a sharp rebuke from Beijing". Imamura said his visit had “nothing to do with” Abe’s trip and the timing was “a coincidence”, saying he "wished to express gratitude and prayed for Japan’s peace and prosperity".

Imamura is a member of key right-wing Diet groups:
Nippon Kaigi (revisionist lobby)
Pro-Yasukuni Alliance
Conference of young parliamentarians supporting the idea that the Yasukuni Shrine is a true national interest and desire for peace 
Japan Rebirth (Sosei Nippon)
Shinto Seiji Renmei Kokkai Giin Kondankai (Sinseiren, Shinto Political League - Shinto fundamentalism)

Ahead of the 2012 elections, Imamura positioned himself in favor of:
changing the Article 9 of the Constitution of Japan, which prohibits the exercise of the right of collective self-defense
considering the nuclear armament of Japan
re-operating the nuclear power plants that meet the new standards of the Nuclear Regulatory Commission

Masahiro Imamura, who holds rather radical positions about nuclear issues, was until April 26, 2017 the minister in charge of coping with the aftermath of the Fukushima nuclear power plant disaster. He was forced to step down over a remark that he had made the previous day suggesting that it had been better that the 2011 earthquake and tsunami had hit the Tohoku region than the Tokyo region. He has been replaced by Masayoshi Yoshino who had been chairman of the special House of Representatives committee on Tohoku reconstruction.

References

External links 
  in Japanese.
 Profile on the LDP website: jimin.jp/english/profile/members/114645.html

Members of the House of Representatives (Japan)
University of Tokyo alumni
People from Saga Prefecture
Living people
1947 births
Members of Nippon Kaigi
Liberal Democratic Party (Japan) politicians
21st-century Japanese politicians